The Tunisia national under-17 football team, nicknamed Les Aigles de Carthage (The Eagles of Carthage or The Carthage Eagles), is the national under-17 football team of Tunisia and is controlled by the Tunisian Football Federation. The team competes in the African U-17 Championship, UNAF U-17 Tournament and the FIFA U-17 World Cup, which is held every two years.

Honours 
 African U-17 Championship:
 Third Place (1):  2013
 UNAF U-17 Tournament:
 Champions (4):  :2008, 2009, 2012, 2017
 Runners-up (6):  :2006, 2007, 2010, 2015, 2016, 2021
 Third Place (5):  :2012, 2014, 2018, 2018, 2022
 Arab Cup U-17:
 Champions (1):  : 2012

Tournament Records 
 Champions   Runners-up   Third place   Fourth place

Red border color indicates tournament was held on home soil.

FIFA U-16 and U-17 World Cup record

CAF U-17 Championship record

Arab Cup U-17 record

UNAF U-17 Tournament record

CAF U-16 and U-17 World Cup Qualifiers record

Current squad
Squad for XXX on XXXXX

Caps and goals as of 5 February 2013.

See also 
 Tunisia women's national under-17 football team
 Tunisia national football team
 Tunisia A' national football team
 Tunisia national under-23 football team
 Tunisia national under-20 football team
 Tunisia national under-15 football team

External links 
 official site of FTF  (archived 17 April 2013)

African national under-17 association football teams
under-17